Raoul Wallenberg Traditional High School is a high school in San Francisco, California, USA. It was founded in 1981 in honor of the Swedish architect, businessman, diplomat, and humanitarian Raoul Wallenberg. In recognition of its namesake, the school's motto is "The individual can make a difference" and all students are required to complete at least 100 hours of community service before graduating.

History
The campus originally opened on September 3, 1952, as Anza Elementary School. It was remodeled and reopened as a high school facility in 1981.

Demographics

For the 2020-2021 school year, total minority enrollment was 83%, with 47% of the student body coming from an economically disadvantaged household.

Academic indicators

The graduation rate in 2020-2021 was 93.5%, compared to district average of 58.2% and state average of 83.6%. In 2019-2020, 63% of graduates completed all of the courses required for University of California and California State University admission.

The dropout rate in 2020-2021 was 3.9%, compared to district average of 36.6% and state average of 9.4%. The school reported that 14.6% of students were chronically absent.

In the 2022 U.S. News & World Report rankings, 55% of Wallenberg students were considered proficient in mathematics (compared to 32% in the district and 30% in the state), 66% were proficient in reading (compared to 49% in the district and 60% in the state), and 45% were proficient in science (compared to 25% in the district and 30% in the state). 65% of 12th grade students took at least one Advanced Placement (AP) exam.

During the 2020-2021 school year, 83% of students said they felt the school provided a climate of support for academic learning. 74% felt safe at school and 58% reported a sense of belonging.

Athletics 

For the 2022-2023 school year, Wallenberg High School is a member of the California Interscholastic Federation in the following sports:
 Badminton (co-ed)
 Baseball (boys)
 Basketball (boys and girls)
 Cross country (co-ed)
 Flag football (girls)
 Golf (boys and girls)
 Soccer (boys and girls)
 Softball (girls)
 Swimming (co-ed)
 Tennis (boys and girls)
 Track and field (co-ed)
 Volleyball (boys and girls)

See also 

 Wallenberg Set

References

External links

 Raoul Wallenberg Traditional High School
 Wallenberg PTSA
 Wallenberg High School Community Foundation
 Wallenberg alum group (requires linked-in account)

High School
Public high schools in San Francisco
San Francisco Unified School District schools
1981 establishments in California